Kenneth Bentley Kramer (born February 19, 1942) is an American lawyer, politician, and jurist from Colorado. He is a former Republican member of the United States House of Representatives.

Born in 1942, in Chicago, Kramer grew up in the city's suburb of Skokie, Illinois. He attended the University of Illinois, and after earning his degree, entered Harvard University, from which he received his Juris Doctor. In 1966, he was admitted to the bar, and by 1970, he had risen to the position of assistant district attorney for the state's Fourth Judicial District.

In 1972, Kramer was elected to the Colorado House of Representatives and served for three terms until 1978. That year, he was elected to represent the state's 5th congressional district, filling the vacancy left by U.S. Senator-elect William Armstrong. Kramer held the seat for eight years. In 1986, he retired to run for the United States Senate, but lost the election to Democrat Tim Wirth. Kramer returned to Colorado Springs, Colorado to be an attorney in private practice.

Since retiring, Kramer has held several positions. President Ronald Reagan nominated Kramer to be Assistant Secretary of the Army (Financial Management and Comptroller) on June 10, 1988; the United States Senate confirmed Kramer by unanimous consent on October 14, 1988. He was nominated by President George H. W. Bush and appointed as a Judge on the United States Court of Appeals for Veterans Claims in 1989. He was chief judge of the court from 2000 until he retired in 2004.  He is married to Louise Kotoshirodo Kramer.

See also
 List of Jewish members of the United States Congress

External links

References

 

1942 births
People from Skokie, Illinois
University of Illinois Urbana-Champaign alumni
Harvard Law School alumni
Republican Party members of the Colorado House of Representatives
Living people
Judges of the United States Court of Appeals for Veterans Claims
United States Article I federal judges appointed by George H. W. Bush
20th-century American judges
Republican Party members of the United States House of Representatives from Colorado
Politicians from Chicago
Politicians from Colorado Springs, Colorado
Colorado lawyers
United States Army civilians